Kyung-ju, also spelled Kyung-joo or Kyong-ju, is a Korean unisex given name. Its meaning differs based on the hanja used to write each syllable of the name. There are 54 hanja with the reading "kyung" and 56 hanja with the reading "ju" on the South Korean government's official list of hanja which may be registered for use in given names. 

People with this name include:
Howard Koh (Korean name Koh Kyongju, born 1952), American male public health official of Korean descent
Esther K. Chae (Korean name Chae Kyung-ju, born 1968), South Korean-born American actress
K. J. Choi (Korean name Choi Kyung-ju, born 1970), South Korean male professional golfer
Kim Kyung-ju (born 1976), South Korean male poet and performance artist
Esther Hahn (Korean name Hahn Kyung-joo, born 1985), American female surfer of Korean descent
Kim Kyong-ju, North Korean female diver; Asian Games bronze medalist in diving, 2002

Fictional characters with this name include:
Kim Kyung-joo, female supporting character in 2011 South Korean television series Glory Jane
Oh Kyung-joo, female supporting character in 2013 South Korean television series Good Doctor

See also
List of Korean given names

References

Korean unisex given names